Air New Zealand Limited is the flag carrier airline of New Zealand. Based in Auckland, the airline operates scheduled passenger flights to 20 domestic and 30 international destinations in 18 countries, primarily around and within the Pacific Rim. The airline has been a member of the Star Alliance since 1999.

Air New Zealand succeeded Tasman Empire Airways Limited on 1 April 1965. The airline served only international routes until 1978, when the government merged it and the domestic New Zealand National Airways Corporation (NAC) into a single airline under the Air New Zealand name. Air New Zealand was privatised in 1989, but returned to majority government ownership in 2001 after near bankruptcy due to a failed tie up with Australian carrier Ansett Australia. In the 2017 financial year to June, Air New Zealand carried 15.95 million passengers.

Air New Zealand's route network focuses on Australasia and the South Pacific, with long-haul flight services to eastern Asia and North America. It was the last airline to circumnavigate the world with flights to London Heathrow via both Los Angeles and Hong Kong. The latter ended in March 2013 when Air New Zealand stopped Hong Kong – London flights, in favour of a codeshare agreement with Cathay Pacific. The airline's main hub is Auckland Airport, located near Mangere in the southern part of the Auckland urban area.

Air New Zealand currently operates a fleet of Airbus A320, Airbus A320neo family, Boeing 777, and Boeing 787 jet aircraft, as well as a regional fleet of ATR 72 and Bombardier Q300 turboprop aircraft. Air New Zealand was awarded Airline of the Year in 2010 and 2012 by the Air Transport World Global Airline Awards. In 2014, Air New Zealand was ranked the safest airline in the world by JACDEC.

History

On 1 April 1965, Tasman Empire Airways Limited was rebranded as Air New Zealand, the Government of New Zealand having purchased the Government of Australia's 50% stake in 1961.

Air New Zealand began as Tasman Empire Airways Limited, founded in 1939 by an international agreement between New Zealand, Australia, and the United Kingdom. Its initial shareholders were the New Zealand Government, Union Airways of New Zealand, Qantas and the British Overseas Airways Corporation. It was formed to fly trans-Tasman routes and carry passengers, cargo and mail between Australia and New Zealand. Incorporated on 26 April 1940, it started operations four days later, on 30 April. Its first flight, flown with a Short S30 flying boat, connected Auckland and Sydney.

Following World War II, TEAL operated weekly flights from Auckland to Sydney, and added Wellington and Fiji to its routings. The New Zealand and Australian governments purchased 50% stakes in TEAL in 1953, and the airline ended flying boat operations in favour of land-based turboprop airliners by 1960. On 1 April 1965, TEAL became Air New Zealand—the New Zealand government having purchased Australia's 50% stake in the carrier.

With the increased range of the Douglas DC-8s the airline's first jet aircraft, Air New Zealand began transpacific services to the United States and Asia with Los Angeles and Honolulu added as destinations in 1965. The airline further acquired wide-body McDonnell Douglas DC-10 airliners in 1973. The DC-10s introduced the new koru-inspired logo for the airline, which remains to this day.

In 1978, the domestic airline National Airways Corporation (NAC) and its subsidiary Safe Air were merged into Air New Zealand to form a single national airline, further expanding the carrier's operations. As a result, NAC's Boeing 737 and Fokker F27 aircraft joined Air New Zealand's fleet alongside its DC-8 and DC-10 airliners. The merger also resulted in the airline having two IATA airline designators: TE from Air New Zealand and NZ from NAC. TE continued to be used for international flights and NZ for domestic flights until 1990, when international flights assumed the NZ code.

In 1981, Air New Zealand introduced its first Boeing 747 airliner, and a year later initiated service to London via Los Angeles. The five 747-200s owned by Air New Zealand were all named after ancestral Maori canoes. 1985 saw the introduction of Boeing 767-200ER airliners to fill the large size gap between the Boeing 737 and 747 (the DC-8 and DC-10 had been withdrawn by 1983). In 1989 the airline was privatised with a sale to a consortium headed by Brierley Investments. (with remaining stakes held by Qantas, Japan Airlines, American Airlines, and the New Zealand government). The New Zealand air transport market underwent deregulation in 1990, prompting Air New Zealand to acquire a 50% stake in Ansett Transport Industries in 1995.

In March 1999, Air New Zealand became a member of the Star Alliance. From 1999 through 2000, Air New Zealand became embroiled in an ownership battle over Ansett with co-owner News Limited over a possible sale of the under-performing carrier to Singapore Airlines.

Merger with Ansett

In 2000, Air New Zealand announced that it had chosen instead to acquire the entirety of Ansett Transport Industries (increasing its 50% stake in the carrier to 100%) for A$680 million from News Corporation in an attempt to break into the Australian aviation market. Business commentators believe this to have been a critical mistake, as Ansett's fleet, staffing levels and infrastructure far outweighed that of Air New Zealand. Subsequently, both carriers' profitability came under question, and foreign offers to purchase the Air New Zealand Group were considered. In September 2001, plagued by costs it could not possibly afford, the Air New Zealand / Ansett Group neared collapse. A failed attempt at purchasing Virgin Blue was the final straw, and on 12 September, out of both time and cash, Air New Zealand placed Ansett Australia into voluntary administration, following which Ansett was forced to cease operations. Air New Zealand announced a NZ$1.425 billion operating loss. Air New Zealand was subsequently bailed out by the New Zealand Government, with Helen Clark's Labour Government taking an 82% stake in the company.

21st century

In October 2001, Air New Zealand was re-nationalised under a New Zealand government NZ$885 million rescue plan (with the government taking an 82% stake), and subsequently received new leadership. This act was the only thing that spared Air New Zealand from going into administration and likely grounding.

In 2002, Air New Zealand reconfigured its domestic operations under a low-cost airline business plan, and the New Zealand government weighed (and later refused) a proposal from Qantas to purchase a one-fifth stake in the carrier. Air New Zealand returned to profitability in 2003, reporting a net profit of $NZ165.7 million for that year. The carrier saw increasing profits through 2004 and 2005. In 2004, the airline announced a comprehensive relaunch of its long-haul product, featuring the introduction of new seats in its business, premium economy, and economy class cabins.

In 2003, Air New Zealand added the Airbus A320 airliner to its fleet for use on short-haul international flights, and later, domestic flights. In 2005, the airline received its first Boeing 777 aircraft (–200ER variant), and placed orders for the Boeing 787 Dreamliner in 2004. The airline later was announced as the launch customer for the -9 variant of the 787.

On 21 December 2010, the New Zealand government approved an alliance between Air New Zealand and Australian airline Virgin Blue (now named Virgin Australia), which allowed both airlines to expand operations between Australia and New Zealand with codeshares for trans-Tasman and connecting domestic flights; and reciprocal access to frequent flyer programmes and airport lounges. Air New Zealand subsequently purchased a 26% shareholding in Virgin Australia Holdings (Virgin Australia's parent company) to cement the relationship. By October 2016 Air New Zealand sold its remaining stake in Virgin Australia to investors and the Nasham Group. On 4 April 2018, Air New Zealand ended its partnership with Virgin Australia effective 28 October 2018.

In 2011, Air New Zealand introduced the Boeing 777-300ER airliner, as well as the Economy Skycouch, a set of three economy class seats that could be converted into a flat multi-purpose surface by raising the leg rests. After a four-year delay, Air New Zealand took delivery of its first Boeing 787-9 on 9 July 2014. The airline retired its last Boeing 747 in September 2014, the last Boeing 737 in September 2015, and the last Boeing 767 in March 2017, leaving it with a simplified fleet of Airbus A320 aircraft for short-haul and Boeing 777 and 787 aircraft for long-haul.

In November 2013, the New Zealand Government reduced its share in Air New Zealand from 73% to 53% as part of its controversial asset sales programme. It made $365 million from this deal.

In October 2019, the airline announced it would stop its Los Angeles to London route in October 2020 while launching a new non-stop route from Auckland to New York. The London route was prematurely cancelled in March 2020 due to the COVID-19 pandemic, while the New York route was delayed, with the first flight taking place on 17 September 2022.

Corporate affairs and identity

Head office
The Air New Zealand head office, "The Hub," is a  office park located at the corner of Beaumont and Fanshawe streets in Wynyard Quarter, Auckland. The office includes two connected six-level buildings. The facility consists of a lot of glass to allow sunlight and therefore reduce electricity consumption. The building does not have cubicle walls. Lights automatically turn off at 7:30 A.M. and turn on at 6 P.M. Sensors throughout the building can turn on lights if they detect human activity, and turn off lights if human activity is not detected for 15 minutes. The buildings cost $60 million New Zealand dollars to build and develop. From late September to early October 2006 the airline moved 1,000 employees from four buildings in the Auckland CBD and other buildings elsewhere.

The company previously had its head office in the Quay Tower in the CBD. In its history the airline had its head office in Airways House on Customs Street East.

The company also occupies premises at the Smales Farm Business Park in Takapuna on the North Shore, adjacent to the bus station and Northern motorway. It is home to the Contact Centre staff (additional to those at 'The Hub'), Tandem Travel and other services.

Subsidiaries

Operations subsidiaries
Air New Zealand Cargo is the only current subsidiary of Air New Zealand Limited.

Air New Zealand had wholly owned subsidiary regional airlines – Air Nelson, Mount Cook Airline and Eagle Airways– that served secondary destinations in New Zealand. Together they made up Air New Zealand Link. On 26 August 2016 Eagle Airways ceased operations, in late 2019 Air Nelson and Mount Cook Airline were merged into its parent's operations.

 Air Nelson was based in Nelson, and operated Bombardier Q300s.
 Mount Cook Airline was based in Christchurch, and operated ATR 72-500 and ATR 72-600 turboprop aircraft.

Subsidiary company Zeal320 was introduced to help combat increasing labour costs. Zeal320 operated Air New Zealand's trans-Tasman fleet of Airbus A320-200 aircraft under the Air New Zealand brand. On 31 July 2006, flights were re-numbered to the NZ700-999 series for trans-Tasman services, and NZ1000 series for domestic services. All of Air New Zealand's A320-200s were registered to Zeal320 until 26 November 2008, when ownership of the fleet was transferred back to Air New Zealand. However, staff that worked the A320-200 fleet were still employed by this subsidiary. This was a source of contention within the airline group in which these employees were paid at a lower scale than their mainline counterparts. Continued industrial action by staff employed in this subsidiary during 2009 permanently delayed a proposed low-cost carrier airline as a successor to Freedom Air that would have also employed the Airbus A320 on domestic routes to counter Jetstar Airways, also operating in New Zealand. In 2015 Zeal320 was removed from the New Zealand Companies Office.

Technical subsidiaries
The following are technical operations subsidiaries of Air New Zealand:

 Air New Zealand Engineering Services
 Christchurch Engine Centre (50%)

In June 2015, Air New Zealand confirmed the sale of its Safe Air engineering subsidiary to the Australian arm of Airbus.

Sponsorships
Air New Zealand was the title sponsor of the Air New Zealand Cup domestic rugby union club competition through the 2009 season. The airline remains a major sponsor of New Zealand rugby, including the New Zealand national rugby union team, known as the All Blacks. The airline also sponsors the Air New Zealand Wine Awards and World of Wearable Arts; and partners with New Zealand's Department of Conservation and Antarctica New Zealand.

Brand and livery

The Air New Zealand symbol is a Māori koru, a stylised representation of a silver fern frond unfolding. A redesigned logo was unveiled on 21 March 2006. The "Pacific Wave" fuselage stripes were removed from short-haul aircraft in 2009, simplifying the overall livery, and was in the process of also being removed from long haul aircraft before the logo was changed again.

On 27 March 2006, Air New Zealand embarked on a changeover to a new brand identity, involving a new Zambesi-designed uniform, new logo, new colour scheme and new look check-in counters and lounges. The new uniforms featured a colour palette mirroring the greenstone, teal, schist and slate hues of New Zealand; sea and sky (a Māori motif created by Derek Lardelli) fabric woven from merino wool; and curves inspired by the airline's logo symbol, the koru. A greenstone colour replaces the blue Pacific Wave colour, inspired by the colour of the pounamu, the prized gemstone found in New Zealand. The Air New Zealand Koru was woven through all Air New Zealand's signage and products.

Later in 2009 staff were involved in testing fabrics and cuts of uniforms. "'It would be fair to say that the lessons from the development and introduction of the current uniform have been taken on board," said the airline's CEO after widespread public and staff criticism.

A rebranding was announced in July 2012. Ditching the teal and green colours that had represented the airline since its beginnings as Tasman Empire Airways (TEAL) in 1939, black was adopted as the brand colour in a joint effort between the airline, New Zealand design agency Designworks and renowned Kiwi typographer Kris Sowersby; as well as a new logo typeface. The tails of the aircraft and the typeface changed to black, while the rest of the fuselage remained white.

Then CEO Rob Fyfe said of the rebranding: "Black has resonated well with our customers and staff who identify with it as the colour of New Zealand and a natural choice for our national airline. It inspires pride, is part of our Kiwi identity and a symbol of Kiwi success on the world stage." The airline began using black as its corporate colour ahead of a sponsorship campaign with NZ's rugby union team, the All Blacks, in 2011.

Another new livery was announced on 12 June 2013. In conjunction with a NZ$20 million Memorandum of Understanding with the national tourism agency Tourism New Zealand for joint marketing, TNZ granted permission for Air New Zealand to use the "New Zealand Fern Mark", a standard fern logo used and managed by Tourism NZ and NZ Trade and Enterprise for international promotion, in its livery.

Two new liveries were unveiled. The first is predominantly white with a black strip running downwards on the rear fuselage from the tail, adorned with a koru logo in white, to disappear downwards just aft of the junction of the wings with the fuselage. The black and white fern mark adorns the fuselage. This livery is used on most of the fleet. A select number have an all black livery with the fern in silver, including the airline's first Boeing 787-9. Extensive consumer surveys by Air New Zealand revealed 78 percent people believed the Fern Mark fits with the airline's brand and represents New Zealand. The first aircraft to be painted in this livery was rolled out on 24 September 2013.

Special liveries

 In 1973, the first of the airline's McDonnell Douglas DC-10-30s arrived with 1974 British Commonwealth Games "NZ74" logo on both sides of the forward fuselage beneath the cabin windows.
 In 1984, pictures of the Buckingham Palace horse guards with 'London, Here We Come' were placed on the side of the hump of the airline's new Boeing 747-200Bs when Air New Zealand was allowed to fly the Los Angeles – London leg of the trans-Pacific route in its own name.
 A special livery featuring an image of the All Blacks front row of Carl Hoeft, Anton Oliver and Kees Meeuws and a black tail was used on the Boeing 747-400 aircraft used to transport the team to the 1999 Rugby World Cup. Two other aircraft were wore the special All Blacks scheme: a Boeing 737-200QC and a Saab 340 of Air Nelson; both these aircraft retained their blue teal tail colours.
 In 1999, one Boeing 737-300 was painted in a 'New Millennium' livery depicting celebrations and the America's Cup regatta that was to be held in 2000.
 In 2002 and 2003 Air New Zealand marked its position as "the official airline to Middle Earth" by decorating three aircraft with The Lord of the Rings imagery, applied as giant decals. The imagery featured actors from the film trilogy The Lord of the Rings against backdrops of New Zealand locations used in the films.
 In 2008, one of the airline's Boeing 737-300s was painted into a lime green Air New Zealand 'Holidays' livery.
 During 2011 and 2012, two aircraft – an Airbus A320 and a Boeing 777-300ER – were painted in an All Blacks-inspired livery. The aircraft were completely black, with a silver fern motif covering the aft section of the fuselage. Some Air New Zealand Link aircraft were also decorated in the scheme: an ATR 72-600 operated by Mount Cook Airline; and two Beechcraft 1900Ds operated by now-defunct subsidiary Eagle Airways.
 In November 2012, Boeing 777-300ER ZK-OKP was repainted in the new "black-tail" livery and fitted with an  decal promoting the premiere and release of the first film in The Hobbit trilogy. The decal took six days and 400-man-hours to install.
In December 2013, ahead of the premiere of the second part of the Hobbit trilogy, The Desolation of Smaug, Air New Zealand applied two 54-metre long images of the dragon Smaug on the sides of a Boeing 777-300ER.

Destinations

Air New Zealand serves 20 domestic destinations and 30 international destinations in eighteen countries and territories across Asia, North America and Oceania.

Air New Zealand previously operated four fifth freedom routes (i.e. between two non-New Zealand destinations). The airline operated weekly flights from Rarotonga to Sydney and Los Angeles, in addition to flights connecting via Auckland. In 2012, after securing a contract from the Australian government – Air New Zealand launched twice-weekly services from Sydney and Brisbane to Norfolk Island on its A320 aircraft.

Codeshare agreements
Air New Zealand has codeshare agreements with the following airlines:

 Aerolíneas Argentinas
 Air Canada
 Air China
 Air Tahiti Nui
 Aircalin
 All Nippon Airways
 Asiana Airlines
 Cathay Pacific
 Etihad Airways
 EVA Air
 Fiji Airways
 Lufthansa
 Qantas
 Singapore Airlines
 South African Airways
 Turkish Airlines
 United Airlines
 Virgin Atlantic

Fleet

As of February 2023, Air New Zealand operates 106 aircraft. The jet fleet consists of 54 aircraft: 17 Airbus A320 and 16 Airbus A320/A321neo aircraft for short-haul flights, and seven Boeing 777-300ER and fourteen Boeing 787-9 Dreamliner jet aircraft for long-haul flights. The airline has four Airbus A321neo and eight Boeing 787-10 aircraft on order.

The airline's turboprop fleet operates regional domestic services and consists of 52 aircraft: 29 ATR 72-600 aircraft and 23 De Havilland Canada Dash 8 Q300 aircraft.

Cabin

Domestic
Air New Zealand domestic services are almost exclusively operated by A320 and A320neo family, ATR 72 and Dash 8 aircraft. All flights are operated in a single class all-economy configuration, with seats configured 3-3 on the A320 and A320neo family and 2-2 on the ATR 72 and Dash 8.

Australia and Pacific Islands
Flights to and from Australia and the Pacific Islands are operated by Airbus A320neo family, Boeing 787, and Boeing 777 aircraft. The A320neo aircraft operate in a single class all-economy configuration, while 787 and 777 aircraft operate in a three-class configuration: business, premium economy, and economy.

In response to increasing competition from low-cost carriers, namely Jetstar Airways, Air New Zealand introduced "Seats to Suit" on Australian and Pacific Islands flights in late 2010. It offers three or four service tiers in economy class: Seat, Seat plus Bag, The Works, and on A320 and A320neo-operated flights, Works Deluxe (Premium Economy replaces Works Deluxe on 787 and 777-operated flights).

Long-haul international
Long-haul flights to Asia and North America are exclusively operated by Boeing 777 and 787 aircraft.

Business Premier
Business Premier is the highest available class on Air New Zealand flights. The seating is configured in a herringbone layout in a 1-2-1 configuration on the 777 and 1-1-1 on the 787. The seat converts to a full-length lie-flat bed.

Premium Economy
Premium Economy is in a dedicated cabin, which shares lavatories with the Business Premier cabin. The class has the same mood lighting, dining and wine selection and in-seat power as the Business Premier cabin. The seats have a 9-inch recline and extendable leg rests with a 2-4-2 configuration on the 777, and a 2-3-2 configuration on the 787.

Economy

Economy class is available on all aircraft, in a 3-3-3 configuration on the 787, and a 3-4-3 configuration on the 777. Each seat has its own AVOD entertainment system, with a 9-inch screen on the 787, and a 10.6-inch touchscreen on the 777.

Economy SkyCouch
The Economy SkyCouch is available on all 787 and 777 aircraft on flights longer than 6 hours duration; where the aircraft are used on shorter routes, the leg rests are locked out and the Skycouch seats act as regular economy seats. It is a set of three Economy class seats on the window rows of the cabin that have armrests that retract into the seat back, and full leg rests that individually and manually can be raised to horizontal to form a flat surface extending to the back of the seats in front. It is largely designed for families for use as a flat play surface, and for couples, who on purchasing the middle seat for 25% more each, can use it as a flat sleeping surface. Each SkyCouch seat is equipped with the same basic facilities as a standard Economy seat.

The SkyCouch has earned the nickname "cuddle class" by media reporting on the innovative seating, from the ability for couples to curl up and "cuddle" together on the  flat surface. Concerns were raised almost immediately over the couch potentially being a new way to join the mile high club. Air New Zealand responded that public displays of affection of that level would not be tolerated in its aircraft. The airline even released a billboard advertisement entitled "The Economy SkyCouch activity guide", suggesting "spoons" (hugs) were allowed, but "forks" (sexual activity) were not.

In-flight entertainment and magazine

Air New Zealand offers audio video on demand in all classes on international services on its aircraft. The AVOD system, branded Kia Ora, features multiple channels of video, audio, music, and games. Passengers can start and stop programs, plus rewind and fast-forward as desired. It is a gate-to-gate in-flight entertainment experience: passengers can start their entertainment as soon as they board the aircraft, and continue until they arrive at the gate of their destination, maximising play time, which is especially useful for its short-haul Tasman and Pacific Island flights. Gate-to-gate in-flight entertainment is not available on certain seats in economy (such as the bulkhead and emergency exit row seats).

AVOD screen size varies:
 Business Premier: 
 Premium Economy: 
 Economy: 

Kia Ora, the airline's in-flight magazine, was removed from international flights from March 2009. It is now only in seat backs on domestic and trans-Tasman services, however it can still be found in the inflight magazine racks on international flights. As a guide on international services, there is now a brief publication named Entertainment Magazine detailing the entertainment available on the flight, which also contains the buy on board 'in-Bites' menu.

In April 2020, Kia Ora publisher, the Bauer Media Group, ceased publication of the magazine and several New Zealand titles as result of the economic effects of the COVID-19 pandemic in New Zealand. In June 2020, Bauer Media's Australian and New Zealand operations were sold to Mercury Capital. In late September 2020, Mercury Capital rebranded Bauer Media as Are Media, which took over publication of Kia Ora.

Services

Air New Zealand Lounge

The Air New Zealand Lounge is Air New Zealand's network of airline lounges around the world. Members of Air New Zealand Koru programme may access the lounges, and also get valet parking, priority wait listing, exclusive check-in, extra checked in baggage and preferred seating.

Airpoints
Airpoints is Air New Zealand's frequent-flyer programme. Members earn "Airpoints Dollars", which they can redeem at face value on any fare for flights ticketed and operated by Air New Zealand. Members can attain status tiers, with increasing privileges ranging from Silver to Gold, then Gold Elite, by accumulating their "Status Points", which are earned separately from Airpoints Dollars. Airpoints Gold and Airpoints Gold Elite have the same recognition as Star Alliance Gold status and benefits across the Star Alliance network. Airpoints Silver status is equivalent to Star Alliance Silver.

Airpoints members receive Status Points for almost every Air New Zealand flight, as well as for many other flights with its Star Alliance partners. Status Points enable members to reach a higher status faster. Status Points will still be granted even on discount fares (such as "Smart Saver" and "grabaseat" fares) that normally do not earn Airpoints Dollars.

Incidents and accidents
 As of November 2022 Air New Zealand has had four hull losses and two hijackings. The airline's worst accident, and only accident with passenger fatalities, was Flight 901 on 28 November 1979, which crashed into Mount Erebus on a sightseeing flight over Antarctica killing all 257 on board.

Controversies

Outsourcing maintenance
On 19 October 2005, Air New Zealand proposed outsourcing most of its heavy maintenance on its long-haul aircraft and engines, which would result in about 600 job losses, mostly in Auckland. Air New Zealand said that there were larger maintenance providers that could provide maintenance work more cheaply due to their large scale. The proposal was estimated to save $100 million over five years and came after many attempts to attract contracts to service other airlines' longhaul aircraft.

Eventually, a union proposal to save some of the remaining jobs was accepted. The proposal included shift and pay changes (most of them pay cuts) which would allow about 300 engineers in Auckland to keep their jobs. 200 were made redundant or resigned.

Minor seating policy

In November 2005, it was revealed that Air New Zealand (along with Qantas and British Airways) had a policy of not seating adult male passengers next to unaccompanied children. The policy came to light following an incident in 2004 when a man who was seated next to a young boy on a Qantas flight in New Zealand was asked to change seats with a female passenger. A steward informed him that "it was the airline's policy that only women were allowed to sit next to unaccompanied children". Air New Zealand later said it had a similar policy to Qantas.

Qantas code-share
On 12 April 2006, Air New Zealand and Qantas announced that they had signed a code-share agreement for their trans-Tasman routes and would file for authorisation from the New Zealand Ministry of Transport and the Australian Competition & Consumer Commission (ACCC). The airlines maintained that they were making losses on Tasman routes due to too many empty seats, and that a codeshare would return the routes to profitability. Critics, particularly Wellington, Christchurch and Melbourne Airports, argued that the codeshare flights would lead to reduced passenger choice and higher airfares, and that airports such as Auckland and Sydney would benefit immensely through economic activity services would bring.

On 15 November 2006 Air New Zealand announced it was withdrawing its application after a draft decision by the ACCC to not approve the code-sharing agreement.

On 31 May 2018 Qantas and Air New Zealand announced that "seamless air travel" would be available to their customers through a new code-sharing agreement. The code-share took effect in October 2018.

Aiding Saudi military

In February 2021, it was reported that Air New Zealand's business unit Gas Turbines had repaired two engines and one power turbine module from vessels belonging to the Royal Saudi Navy. Green Party human rights spokesperson Golriz Ghahraman accused Air New Zealand for being an accomplice to the Saudi Arabian-led intervention in Yemen. New Zealand Prime Minister Jacinda Ardern subsequently ordered the Ministry of Foreign Affairs and Trade to conduct an investigation into Air New Zealand's involvement. The airline reportedly ceased all contractual support to the Saudi military after the matter was made public.

Alternative propulsion
In a 2008 effort to develop an aviation biofuel, Air New Zealand and Boeing researched the jatropha plant to see if it was a viable green alternative to conventional fuel. A two-hour test flight, using a 50-50 mixture of the new biofuel with Jet A-1 feeding a Rolls-Royce RB211 engine of one of the airline's 747-400s, was completed on 30 December 2008. The engine was then removed to be scrutinised and studied to identify any differences between the jatropha blend and regular Jet A1. No effects to performances were found. The use of jatropha has been identified as a possible future fuel but large tracts of low quality land needed to grow the plant would have to be found without impeding other agricultural uses.

Awards 
In 2020, Air New Zealand won an award "Best airline in Airline Excellence Awards 2020" carried out by AirlineRatings.com.

Advisory against baggage trackers 
According to Simple Flying, Air New Zealand issued an advisory against baggage trackers. This includes the Apple AirTag, Samsung SmartTag, Tile trackers, and anything of the liking. As travel returns to Australia and New Zealand, they issued the advisory as people are starting to put a tracker in their baggage. This proves helpful in the event of baggage loss or misplacement, as the passenger will know where their bag is. These trackers operate using a coin cell lithium battery and emit Bluetooth signals that can't be turned off. This poses a safety and a fire hazard to the aircraft.

One month prior, fellow Star Alliance member Lufthansa banned all AirTags from its aircraft.

See also
 Air transport in New Zealand
 List of airports in New Zealand
 List of airlines of New Zealand
 Transport in New Zealand

References

External links 

 

 
Airlines established in 1965
Ansett Australia
Companies based in Auckland
Government-owned airlines
Government-owned companies of New Zealand
New Zealand brands
Star Alliance
New Zealand companies established in 1965